Kriegman is a surname. Notable persons with this name include:
Carolyn Kriegman, American jewellery maker
David Kriegman, American engineer
Daniel Kriegman, American psychoanalyst
Mitchell Kriegman (born 1952), American  television show maker, writer, director, producer, consultant, story editor, author, composer and actor